Mid Worcestershire is a constituency represented in the House of Commons of the UK Parliament since 2015 by Nigel Huddleston, a Conservative.

Members of Parliament

Constituency profile
Income levels are on average considerably higher than the national average and levels of rented and social housing are below the national average, particularly levels seen in cities.

The constituency, which has 72,317 people aged 18 and over according to the 2001 census, plus 39,645 households includes the towns of Droitwich Spa and Evesham and the many semi-rural villages around the cathedral city of Worcester, sits across an undulating part of the West Midlands with good access to its central commercial, service sector and industrial areas.

Boundaries 

The present Mid Worcestershire constituency, has existed almost intact since 1997, covers central and south-eastern parts of the county of Worcestershire.  It covers most of the Wychavon district, including Broadway, Droitwich and Evesham, but excluding the areas around Pershore (which is in the Worcestershire West constituency) and ward of Inkberrow (in the Redditch constituency).
1983–1997: The Borough of Redditch, and the District of Wychavon wards of Bowbrook, Claines Central and West, Claines East, Dodderhill, Droitwich Central, Droitwich South, Droitwich West, Hanbury, Hartlebury, Lovett, and Ombersley.

The original constituency, which was created in 1983, covered a much different area.  Situated to the north of Worcester, it included the towns of Droitwich and Redditch.

2010–present: The District of Wychavon wards of Badsey, Bengeworth, Bowbrook, Bretforton and Offenham, Broadway and Wickhamford, Dodderhill, Drakes Broughton, Droitwich Central, Droitwich East, Droitwich South East, Droitwich South West, Droitwich West, Evesham North, Evesham South, Fladbury, Great Hampton, Hartlebury, Harvington and Norton, Honeybourne and Pebworth, Little Hampton, Lovett and North Claines, Norton and Whittington, Ombersley, Pinvin, The Littletons, and Upton Snodsbury.

1997–2010: The District of Wychavon wards of Badsey, Bowbrook, Bretforton and Offenham, Broadway, Dodderhill, Drakes Broughton, Droitwich Central, Droitwich South, Droitwich West, Evesham East, Evesham Hampton, Evesham North, Evesham South, Evesham West, Fladbury, Hanbury, Hartlebury, Harvington and Norton, Honeybourne and Pebworth, Lenches, Lovett, North Claines, Ombersley, Pinvin, Spetchley, The Littletons, Upton Snodsbury, and Wickhamford.

History 
Eric Forth of the Conservative Party represented the original Mid Worcestershire constituency from 1983 until 1997.  Following the considerable boundary changes (described above) that took effect at the 1997 general election, Peter Luff (whose Worcester constituency considerably overlapped the new seat) was selected as the Conservative candidate, and remained as MP until 2015 when he stood down following his term  (Eric Forth was at the same election instead elected for Bromley and Chislehurst, which seat he held until his death in 2006). Following the 2015 general election, Nigel Huddleston was elected as the new Conservative MP for the constituency.

Elections

Elections in the 2010s

Elections in the 2000s

Elections in the 1990s

Elections in the 1980s

See also 
 List of parliamentary constituencies in Herefordshire and Worcestershire

Notes

References

Parliamentary constituencies in Worcestershire
Constituencies of the Parliament of the United Kingdom established in 1983